Davontavean Martin (born December 14, 1997) is an American football wide receiver for the San Francisco 49ers of the National Football League (NFL). He attended college at Washington State University and Oklahoma State University.

Professional career

On April 30, 2022, Martin signed with the 49ers as an undrafted free agent. He was released during final roster cutdowns on August 30, 2022. He was signed to the practice squad the following day. He signed a reserve/future contract on January 31, 2023.

Personal life
Martin has a daughter.

References

1997 births
Living people
American football wide receivers
Oklahoma State Cowboys football players
San Francisco 49ers players
Washington State Cougars football players